Grevillea floribunda, commonly known as seven dwarfs grevillea, is a species of flowering plant in the family Proteaceae and is endemic to eastern Australia. It is a spreading shrub with oblong to egg-shaped leaves with the narrower end towards the base and groups of six to twenty flowers covered with rusty brown hairs.

Description
The ovary is sessile and the style is reddish.

Taxonomy
Grevillea floribunda was first formally described in 1830 by Robert Brown in his Supplementum primum Prodromi florae Novae Hollandiae. The specific epithet means "profusely flowering".

In 1994,  Peter M. Olde and Neil R. Marriott described two subspecies of G. floribunda and the names are accepted by the Australian Plant Census:
 Grevillea floribunda R.Br. subsp. floribunda
 Grevillea floribunda subsp. tenella Olde & Marriott

Distribution and habitat
Seven dwarfs grevillea grows in forest and woodland and is widespread on the tablelands and western slopes of New South Wales and in south-eastern Queensland. There is a single doubtful record from the Killawarra Forest in Victoria. Subspecies tenella is restricted to the Darling Downs region of Queensland.

References

floribunda
Flora of New South Wales
Flora of Queensland
Proteales of Australia
Plants described in 1830